After winning the American League Central Division in 2002, the 2003 Minnesota Twins were looking to repeat division titles for the first time since 1969 and 1970.  A spark for the team was the July trade of Bobby Kielty for Shannon Stewart.  Stewart provided a veteran presence at the top of the lineup that the team had previously lacked.  The team met its goal of reaching the playoffs, but once again fell short in the postseason.  The Twins lost in four games to the New York Yankees during the AL Division Series.  2003 would be the last year several key players played with the team.

Offseason
 October 14, 2002: Casey Blake was released by the Twins.
 October 21, 2002: José Rodríguez was released by the Twins.
 November 15, 2002: Matt Kinney and Javier Valentín were traded by the Twins to the Milwaukee Brewers for minor leaguers Gerry Oakes and Matt Yeatman. Oakes' 98 mph fastball and diverse athletic talent was a prize that many MLB teams were after.
 November 22, 2002: Carlos Pulido was signed as a free agent by the Twins.
 December 16, 2002: David Ortiz was released by the Twins.
 March 17, 2003: Kenny Rogers was signed by the Twins as a free agent.

Regular season
Under second year manager Ron Gardenhire, The Twins did not look so good coming out of the gates, going 12-14 in March and April. However, they picked it up by going 19-9 in May, improving their record to 31-23 (.574). After having another tough string of games during the middle of the season, the Twins were looking for a jump start. They got it when on July 16 they traded RF Bobby Kielty to Toronto for LF Shannon Stewart. Going into the final month of the season with a record of 71-65 it looked as though the Twins may not win the division, but they finished with a stellar September going 19-7; including an 11-game winning streak. They ended up with a 90-72 (.556) record which was good enough to win the mediocre AL Central.

On April 21, Rick Reed set a Twins individual pitching record by giving up 11 runs (ten were earned) in a 15-1 loss to the New York Yankees.

On June 7 at Qualcomm Stadium, outfielder Jacque Jones hit his 20th lead-off home run as a Minnesota Twin and the total remains the Twins record. Jones' first two career homers in 1999 were lead-off home runs.  Chuck Knoblauch is next in line with 14.

June 17:  In a 14-7 loss to the Kansas City Royals, the Twins gave up 12 runs in the sixth inning, a club high.  Kenny Rogers blew a 3-1 lead allowing four runs.  The final six were allowed by Michael Nakamura.

The lone representative of the Twins in the All-Star Game was closer Eddie Guardado; he gave up two hits and a run on eight pitches.

The highest paid Twin in 2003 was Brad Radke at $8,750,000; followed by Rick Reed at $8,000,000.

Bob Allison and Bob Casey were inducted into the Twins Hall of Fame.

Offense

Catcher A. J. Pierzynski enjoyed his highest career batting average (.312) in his final year with the Twins.  First baseman Doug Mientkiewicz rebounded from a poor 2002 season by hitting .300—although his power numbers (11 home runs) were low for his position.  Luis Rivas cemented his reputation as a mediocre hitter, batting .259 with a .308 on-base percentage.  Corey Koskie saw his average go up to .292 after a dip in 2002.  For the third time in four years, shortstop Cristian Guzmán led the majors in triples this year with 14.  Jacque Jones and Torii Hunter were capable hitters in the outfield, with Jones batting .304 and Hunter driving in a career high 102 runs.  Stewart hit .322 in 270 at bats for the team.

Pitching

Brad Radke, Kenny Rogers, and Kyle Lohse filled the first three spots in the starting rotation throughout the year.  All three had winning records and ERAs in the mid-fours.  Joe Mays and Rick Reed each made 21 mediocre starts.  The leftover starts were mostly left to Johan Santana, who made 18, establishing a foundation that would enable him to win a Cy Young Award the following year.  Eric Milton was injured most of the year, and appeared in only three games.

In the bullpen, Eddie Guardado was once again a reliable closer, with LaTroy Hawkins as his primary set-up man.  Juan Rincón was also able to establish himself as a reliable set-up man, but the other bullpen spots were uncertain.  J. C. Romero regressed in quality, with a 5.00 ERA.  As one might expect, experiments with veterans such as James Baldwin, Carlos Pulido, and the ancient Jesse Orosco did not pan out.

Defense

The infield of Pierzynski, Mientkiewicz, Rivas, Guzman, and Koskie was reliable.  Jacque Jones was solid in left, although Shannon Stewart saw time there when he was acquired for Bobby Kielty.  Torii Hunter had a Gold Glove year in center field.  Right field was manned by the platoon of Dustan Mohr and Bobby Kielty (the duo was dubbed "Dusty Kielmohr") until the arrival of Stewart.

Season standings

Record vs. opponents

Notable transactions
 June 10, 2003: James Baldwin was signed by the Twins as a free agent.
 July 16, 2003: Bobby Kielty was traded by the Twins to the Toronto Blue Jays for Shannon Stewart.
 August 17, 2003: James Baldwin was released by the Twins.
 August 31, 2003: The Twins traded a player to be named later to the New York Yankees for pitcher Jesse Orosco. The Twins completed the deal by sending Juan Padilla to the Yankees on September 2.

Roster

Postseason 

In the American League Division Series, the Twins faced a team which fared well against them in the regular season: The New York Yankees. The Yankees won the 5-game series in four games, outscoring the Twins 16-6. Minnesota defeated the Yankees in game 1, earning a 3-1 victory at Yankee Stadium. However, the Yankees would go on to win the series; winning the next three games 4-1, 3-1, and 8-1. The Yankees eventually lost to the Florida Marlins in the World Series.

See also 2003 American League Division Series.

Player stats

Batting

Starters by position
Note: Pos = Position; G = Games played; AB = At bats; H = Hits; Avg. = Batting average; HR = Home runs; RBI = Runs batted in

Other batters
Note: G = Games played; AB = At bats; H = Hits; Avg. = Batting average; HR = Home runs; RBI = Runs batted in

Pitching

Starting pitchers
Note: G = Games pitched; GS = Games started; IP = Innings pitched; W = Wins; L = Losses; ERA = Earned run average; SO = Strikeouts

Other pitchers
Note: G = Games pitched; IP = Innings pitched; W = Wins; L = Losses; ERA = Earned run average; SO = Strikeouts

Relief pitchers
Note: G = Games pitched; W = Wins; L = Losses; SV = Saves; ERA = Earned run average; SO = Strikeouts

Other post-season awards
Calvin R. Griffith Award (Most Valuable Twin) – Shannon Stewart
Joseph W. Haynes Award (Twins Pitcher of the Year) – Johan Santana
Bill Boni Award (Twins Outstanding Rookie) – Lew Ford
Charles O. Johnson Award (Most Improved Twin) – Johan Santana
Dick Siebert Award (Upper Midwest Player of the Year) – Jim Brower
The above awards are voted on by the Twin Cities chapter of the BBWAA
Carl R. Pohlad Award (Outstanding Community Service) – Doug Mientkiewicz
Sherry Robertson Award (Twins Outstanding Farm System Position Player) – Joe Mauer
Jim Rantz Award (Twins Outstanding Farm System Pitcher) – Jesse Crain

Farm system 

LEAGUE CHAMPIONS: Elizabethton

References

External links
Player stats from www.baseball-reference.com
Team info from www.baseball-almanac.com
Twins history since 2000, from www.mlb.com 
2003 Standings

Minnesota Twins seasons
Minnesota Twins season
American League Central champion seasons
Minnesota Twins